The Horror of It All is a 1964 British horror comedy film directed by Terence Fisher and with a screenplay by Ray Russell. It stars Pat Boone and Erica Rogers.

Plot
American encyclopedia salesman Jack Robinson arrives at a dilapidated mansion in the English countryside belonging to the Marley family. Robinson has fallen in love with Cynthia and wants to ask permission to marry her.

Cynthia's family include: her uncle Percival, an inventor; her cousin Natalia, a macabre, vampire-like creature; Cornwallis, a hammy ex-actor; her uncle Reginald; Grandfather, who lies bedridden upstairs; and cousin Muldoon, who is kept locked up in the fear that he will harm someone.

A cousin of Cynthia has just died and Cornwallis dies after drinking a toast. Jack wants to get the police but they are 20 miles away and the family have no car (Jack's has broken down).

Several attempts are made on Jack's life. He learns that the family fortune consists of one million dollars and one of the Marleys intends to end up with all of it. Later grandpa is killed.

Jack and Cynthia make a dash for freedom and Cynthia reveals that she is the murderer. She conks out Jack.

In hospital, Jack discovered that Cynthia made up the confession to protect him - the real killer is Cornwallis, who was pretending to be dead.

Cast
 Pat Boone as John Robinson
 Erica Rogers as Cynthia Marley
 Dennis Price as Cornwallis Marley
 Andree Melly as Natalie Marley
 Valentine Dyall as Reginald Marley
 Archie Duncan as Muldoon Marley
 Erik Chitty as Grandpa Marley
 Jack Bligh as Percival Marley
 Oswald Laurence as Doctor

Production
The film was made at Shepperton Studios in England. The story is essentially a remake of the classic Universal Studios comedy horror film The Old Dark House (1932), which had already been remade a year earlier. The plot also has elements of the horror comedy Murder, He Says (1945).

Reception
The Los Angeles Times thought Terence Fisher "had the right idea playing the silly plot for laughs but his snail's pace spoils the show. He kills much of the humour by holding a scene after he's made his point."

According to Diabolique magazine "The movie is populated by a fine supporting cast of English character actors playing various eccentrics [...] Boone is a solid straight man, and the film is lively. It’s not up to something like The Cat and the Canary (1939) which it was clearly aping, but those films are harder to do than they look. It’s not bad. It could have done with color and songs."

References

External links

 
 
 
 
The Horror of It All at BFI

1964 films
1964 horror films
1960s comedy horror films
20th Century Fox films
British comedy horror films
Films directed by Terence Fisher
Films scored by Douglas Gamley
Films set in country houses
Films set in England
Lippert Pictures films
1964 comedy films
1960s English-language films
1960s British films